Anglo-Canadian may refer to:

 Canada–United Kingdom relations
 A shorthand form for English Canadian